The Aupouri Peninsula is a tombolo at the northern tip of the North Island of New Zealand. It projects between the Tasman Sea to the west and the Pacific Ocean to the east. It constitutes the northern part of the Far North District, incorporating North Cape, Houhora and the northern half of Awanui.

History 

The peninsula was an important location for the kauri gum digging trade, which peaked between 1890 and 1935. High quality kauri gum was found around the Parengarenga Harbour in the north, which led to the development of the Parenga Gumfield Company. After 1910, gum digging intensified in the southern half of the peninsula, as the poorer grade gum found in this region greatly increased in value.

Overview 

It is a peninsula on a peninsula, being part of the massive Northland Peninsula (also called the North Auckland Peninsula) which makes up nearly one twelfth of New Zealand's land area. Close to the northern town of Kaitaia, the Northland Peninsula suddenly narrows from a width of 60 kilometres to a mere 10 kilometres, a width which it maintains approximately for the last 100 kilometres of its thrust to the north.

At the base of the peninsula to the east is the natural inlet of the Rangaunu Harbour. Beyond this lies the Karikari Peninsula and the broad sweep of Doubtless Bay. The east coast of the peninsula is dominated by Rangaunu Bay in the south and Great Exhibition Bay in the north. Towards its northern tip is the natural inlet of Parengarenga Harbour, beyond which lies North Cape. Spirits Bay and Tom Bowling Bay are located on northernmost of the land.

The peninsula's best-known feature is on the other coast: almost the entire west coast is the 88-kilometre long Ninety Mile Beach.

At its northern end, the peninsula widens to 30 kilometres. Here there are several capes that appear to be the northernmost point of New Zealand's main islands: Cape Maria van Diemen, North Cape, Cape Reinga, and the Surville Cliffs, which is the actual northernmost point by a few hundred metres, at latitude 34° 23' 47" South. Only a handful of islands in the Three Kings and Kermadec chains lie further north in New Zealand.

Although there are a number of settlements with over 100 people, including Te Hapua, Te Kao, Pukenui and Kaimaumau, the peninsula is sparsely inhabited, with a population of approximately 3,900. For this reason, the area's roads are largely only metalled rather than being sealed. The main road (State Highway 1) is sealed, the final section completed in April 2010. Ninety Mile Beach is a designated highway, but most rental contracts include it in "prohibited roads".  The nearest town to the capes at the tip of the peninsula is Kaitaia, 100 kilometres to the south.

It is named after Te Aupōuri, one of the Māori tribes that inhabits it.

Demographics
The statistical areas include Awanui to the south of the peninsula.

Aupouri Peninsula had a population of 3,912 at the 2018 New Zealand census, an increase of 513 people (15.1%) since the 2013 census, and an increase of 564 people (16.8%) since the 2006 census. There were 1,404 households, comprising 1,968 males and 1,941 females, giving a sex ratio of 1.01 males per female, with 885 people (22.6%) aged under 15 years, 618 (15.8%) aged 15 to 29, 1,701 (43.5%) aged 30 to 64, and 705 (18.0%) aged 65 or older.

Ethnicities were 60.7% European/Pākehā, 59.7% Māori, 4.8% Pacific peoples, 1.9% Asian, and 1.5% other ethnicities. People may identify with more than one ethnicity.

The percentage of people born overseas was 7.8, compared with 27.1% nationally.

Of those people who chose to answer the census's question about religious affiliation, 39.4% had no religion, 38.6% were Christian, 0.2% were Hindu, 0.2% were Muslim, 0.2% were Buddhist and 13.0% had other religions.

Of those at least 15 years old, 273 (9.0%) people had a bachelor or higher degree, and 804 (26.6%) people had no formal qualifications. 249 people (8.2%) earned over $70,000 compared to 17.2% nationally. The employment status of those at least 15 was that 1,305 (43.1%) people were employed full-time, 474 (15.7%) were part-time, and 207 (6.8%) were unemployed.

Aupouri Aquifer 
The Aupouri Aquifer extends along the whole length of Ninety Mile Beach, and includes lowlying land between Waimanoni and Ahipara, covering a total land area of 75,322 hectares. Groundwater levels are monitored and water allocation limits are set by Northland Regional Council. Resource consents for water takes include conditions for monitoring bores to observe water levels and any saltwater intrusion. 

There are a number of small lakes in the Aupouri Peninsula, such as Lake Waiparera, Lake Heather, Lake Ngatu, and Lake Rotoroa. There is a possibility to use these as "window lakes" presenting an extension of the groundwater table ("window lakes" would be affected by groundwater pumping due to the direct hydraulically connection with the aquifer), there is however, little data available on which to base a conclusion.

Use of the aquifer for the avocado industry has caused concerns for the public regarding water security for local communities, and the potential environmental impact on the nearby Kaimaumau wetland.

References 

Far North District
Tombolos
Peninsulas of the Northland Region
Kauri gum